Ghurko is a village of Kharian tehsil in Gujrat district, in the Punjab province of Pakistan. It has a population of roughly 3000. After independence, Ghurko grew greatly in both population and education. It is roughly 140 km from Islamabad, the capital of the country, and more than 99% of the population belongs to the Gujjar caste.

There is one public school in Ghurko, which has classes up to 8th grade. There is one commercial private bank, HBL, on the main road, there is one private hospital, and there are approximately 580 houses in the village.

References 
Welcome to The Village of Ghurko Official Portal

Villages in Kharian Tehsil